Mathilde Ollivier (born 20 September 1994) is a French actress, producer and model. She is known for her role in Overlord (2018).

Early life
She was born and brought up in Montparnasse, Paris. She studied drama and dance at the Conservatoire de Paris and the Cours Simon before going to the Paris International Academy of Dance.

Career

Modeling
Her modeling career has included appearing in the March 2016 edition of Vogue, the October 2016 edition of Purple, and the April 2017 edition of Twin.

Acting
On the French stage, Ollivier has appeared in productions of Dangerous Liaisons and in Mistinguett. Ollivier appeared as Chloe, a French citizen stranded in a Nazi-occupied village ravaged by war, when American troops arrive with a mission in J. J. Abrams's 2018 horror film Overlord. She has filmed 2019's Boss Level with Mel Gibson and Naomi Watts. She was cast in Sister of the Groom with Alicia Silverstone in which Silverstone tries to prevent Ollivier marrying her brother.

Ollivier produced the 2018 documentary Upright Women about the plight of women in Burkina Faso enslaved and forced into marriage.

Filmography

Film

Television

References

External links
 
 

21st-century French actresses
Living people
1994 births
French female models
French stage actresses
French film actresses
French women film producers
French film producers
Actresses from Paris